Eccentrotheca is a genus of "tommotiid" known from Cambrian deposits. Its sclerites form rings that are stacked to produce a widening-upwards conical scleritome.  Individual plates have been homologized with the valves of brachiopods, and a relationship with the phoronids is also likely at a stem-group level. Its pointed end terminated in a stub that probably fastened it to a hard sea floor; its open end has been interpreted as a filter-feeding aperture.

References

Prehistoric protostome genera
Cambrian animals of North America
Paleozoic life of Nova Scotia

Cambrian genus extinctions